Paul G. Schervish (born April 6, 1946) is an American sociologist and former Jesuit priest who specializes in the academic study of philanthropy. He is a professor emeritus of sociology at Boston College, where he formerly served as director of the Center on Wealth and Philanthropy prior to its closure in 2015. During the 2000–01 academic year, he was a Fulbright Scholar at University College Cork. He has been named to the NonProfit Times annual "Power and Influence Top 50" list five times.

References

External links
Faculty page

Living people
1946 births
American sociologists
20th-century American Jesuits
Boston College faculty
University of Detroit Mercy alumni
Northwestern University alumni
Jesuit School of Theology at Berkeley alumni
University of Wisconsin–Madison alumni
Writers from Detroit
21st-century American Jesuits